Heterophleps refusaria, the three-patched bigwing, is a species of geometrid moth in the family Geometridae. It was described by Francis Walker in 1861 and is found in North America.

The MONA or Hodges number for Heterophleps refusaria is 7645.

References

 Scoble, Malcolm J., ed. (1999). Geometrid Moths of the World: A Catalogue (Lepidoptera, Geometridae), 1016.

Further reading

 Arnett, Ross H. (2000). American Insects: A Handbook of the Insects of America North of Mexico. CRC Press.

External links

 Butterflies and Moths of North America
 NCBI Taxonomy Browser, Heterophleps refusaria

Larentiinae